Kibulala, Ssingo, commonly known as Kibulala, is a hill in Ssingo County, Kiboga District in Central Uganda. The name also applied to the village that sits on top of the hill and the Buganda cultural site located there.

Location
The geographical coordinates of Kibulala, Ssingo are:0°42'41.0"N, 31°55'16.0"E (Laatitude:0.711389; Longitude:31.921111).

Overview
Kibulala, Ssingo is the location of the burial place of Ssekabaka Wasswa Chwamale Mwanga Winyi, the elder twin brother of Ssekabaka Kato Kintu Kakulukuku, the first Kabaka of Buganda. The descendants of Winyi of Kibulala constitute the Buganda Clan known as Ababiito b'eKibulala. The late monarch's burial site is recognized by the Buganda Royal Clan. Naalinnya Dina Kigga Mukarukidi, a sister to the reigning Buganda King, Kabaka Ronald Muwenda Mutebi II, is culturally assigned to the site.

See also
Winyi of Kibulala
Kintu of Buganda
Kimera of Buganda
Kabaka of Buganda

References

External links

  

Populated places in Central Region, Uganda
Cities in the Great Rift Valley
Kiboga District